The Ekolot KR-030 Topaz is a Polish ultralight aircraft, designed and produced by Ekolot of Krosno. It was certified in Poland in February 2010. The aircraft is supplied as a kit for amateur construction or as a complete ready-to-fly aircraft.

Design and development
The Topaz is a development of the  Ekolot JK-05L Junior and was designed to comply with the Fédération Aéronautique Internationale microlight rules. It features a cantilever high wing in place of the Junior's strut-braced wing, a two-seats-in-side-by-side configuration enclosed cockpit, fixed tricycle landing gear and a single engine in tractor configuration.

Like the Junior, the Topaz is made from composites. Dual  fuel tanks are located behind the seats. A ballistic parachute is an available option. The standard engine available is the  Rotax 912UL four-stroke powerplant.

The use of a one-piece wing without struts gives the Topaz a  higher cruise speed than the Junior, while resulting in the same empty weight.

The Topaz has been accepted by the US Federal Aviation Administration as a light-sport aircraft.

Specifications (KR-030 Topaz)

References

External links

2010s Polish ultralight aircraft
Homebuilt aircraft
Single-engined tractor aircraft
Ekolot aircraft